Tjernberg is a Swedish surname. Notable people with the surname include: 

Gunilla Tjernberg (1950–2019), Swedish politician
Magdalena Tjernberg (born 1970), Swedish athlete
Ove Tjernberg (1928–2001), Swedish actor

Swedish-language surnames